Sirak Skitnik was a Bulgarian painter. He died in the year 1943 but his piece of Art called "Mountain View" was first auctioned at Rakursi Auction House in the year 2017.

References

1943 deaths
Year of birth missing

20th-century Bulgarian painters